Mount Angsi is a mountain which is located between the border between Ulu Bendul, Kuala Pilah District and Senawang, Seremban District in Negeri Sembilan, Malaysia. Part of the Titiwangsa Mountains, it is the seventh tallest mountain in the state, behind Mts.

References

Ecoregions of Malaysia
Landforms of Negeri Sembilan
Angsi
Kuala Pilah District
Seremban District